Pioneer Cemetery, also known as the Pioneers Burial Ground and the Indian Fighters Cemetery, is a historic cemetery in Yarmouth, Maine, United States. Dating to 1731, it was the first public burial place in Old North Yarmouth, which was then part of the Province of Massachusetts Bay.

Notable burials
Ebenezer Eaton (1674–1735), killed by Indians
Captain Peter Weare (1695–1743)
Joseph Weare (1737–1774), Indian fighter, son of Captain Peter, nicknamed the Scout
Deacon Jacob Curry Mitchell (1672–1744)
Captain James Parker (1689–1732), one of five local men tasked in 1727 with the management of the new town of North Yarmouth. Their affairs included laying out the highways. He was also the town's first inn owner
Inscriptions recorded by Augustus W. Corliss in his late-19th-century publication Old Times in North Yarmouth, Maine, and later reprinted in Records of the American Catholic Historical Society of Philadelphia, include:

and

Marker
The marker for the burial ground, which was attached to a boulder, was removed to the town's historical society in February 2019, having been in place for ninety years, because some people found the term describing the Abenaki Indians tribe "savage enemies" offensive. Information regarding the intended meaning of the text will be displayed alongside it at the museum.

The plaque reads:

Gallery

References

1731 establishments in the Thirteen Colonies
Cemeteries in Yarmouth, Maine